Below is a table of the current ambassadors of Thailand.

[a] Countries marked in bold host a Thai embassy with diplomatic missions to additional countries

References

 
Lists of ambassadors by country of origin